The Ferrovie dello Stato Italiane (FS; Italian State Railways) Class 552 (Italian: Gruppo 552), formerly Rete Adriatica Class 180 bis, is a 4-4-0 steam locomotive; it was the final development in Italy of the 'American' express locomotive type.

Design and construction
Last in a line of successful 4-4-0 locomotives designed in Florence, the Class 552 was basically an evolution of the earlier Class 545 and Class 550 locomotives, with a larger boiler and bigger cylinders. The class was initially fitted with a prototype tender similar to the definitive one, but with only  of water.

The first series of 24 units was built in 1890 by Ernesto Breda and Ansaldo (12 units each); 12 more were built by Breda from 1900 to 1901.

Service

The Class 552 (until 1905, when the FS were formed, classified RA 180 bis and numbered 1865–1900) were primarily assigned to the most prestigious fast passenger trains of their time, notably the India Mail or Peninsular Express (called in Italian Valigia delle Indie), which was part of the P&O relation between London and Bombay; in Italy, this train ran the itinerary Modane-Turin-Alessandria-Bologna-Ancona-Brindisi, where a ship took the passengers to Alexandria.

However, unlike its predecessors (all disappeared by the 1930s), some locomotives of the class managed to survive until 1946, working around Treviso.

Preservation
One Class 552, the 552.036, survived into preservation; she is currently a static exhibit in the Museo della Scienza e della Tecnologia "Leonardo da Vinci" in Milan.

References

 
 

4-4-0 locomotives
552
Gio. Ansaldo & C. locomotives
Breda locomotives
Railway locomotives introduced in 1890
Standard gauge locomotives of Italy
Rete Adriatica steam locomotives
Passenger locomotives